Henry L. Buker   (1859–1899) was an American professional baseball shortstop and right fielder and played one season with the 1884 Detroit Wolverines. It is unknown what hand he batted and threw with. He was born in Portland, Maine and died in Chicago, Illinois. He is buried in Rosehill Cemetery in Chicago.

External links

1859 births
1899 deaths
Major League Baseball shortstops
Detroit Wolverines players
19th-century baseball players
Minneapolis Millers (baseball) players
Burials at Rosehill Cemetery
Baseball players from Maine
Sportspeople from Portland, Maine